I Dare You is a Philippine reality variety show. This is the first joint project between the network's News and Current Affairs Division and the TV Entertainment Group. The first season premiered as part of ABS-CBN's Kapamilya Gold afternoon lineup from July 11, 2011 to October 21, 2011, and was replaced by Pinoy Big Brother: Unlimited. The program hosted by Jericho Rosales, Iya Villania and Melai Cantiveros. The second season aired from October 12, 2013 to December 28, 2013, replacing The Voice of the Philippines and was replaced by The Biggest Loser Pinoy Edition: Doubles. The program with Cantiveros and three new cast members, Robi Domingo, John Prats and Deniesse Aguilar replacing Villania and Rosales.

Format

Season 1
 
Each week, the series showcases an everyday Filipino (an individual, family or community), who the show refers to as Bidang Kapamilya. These people are those who struggles everyday on life's challenges and have inspiring stories to tell. Together with the hosts, celebrity guests will be challenged to get out of their comfort zone and undergo different challenges to win prizes for the Bidang Kapamilya. Guests will experience the role of an ordinary people and what they do in an ordinary day.

Cast

Final cast

Former cast

Challengers

References

External links

ABS-CBN original programming
2011 Philippine television series debuts
2013 Philippine television series endings
Philippine reality television series
Filipino-language television shows